Ice XVII is a metastable form of ice with a hexagonal structure and helical channels that was discovered in 2016. It can be formed by freezing water with hydrogen molecules at high pressure to form a filled ice, and then removing the hydrogen molecules from the structure. The form has potential for being used in hydrogen storage. Ice XVII made from heavy water can also be reduced to pure cubic ice.

Discovery 

In 2016, the discovery of a new form of ice was announced. Characterized as a "porous water ice metastable at atmospheric temperatures", this new form was discovered by taking a filled ice and removing the non-water components, leaving the crystal structure behind, similar to how ice XVI, another porous form of ice, was synthesized from a clathrate hydrate.

The filled ice is then placed in a vacuum, and the temperature gradually increased until the hydrogen frees itself from the crystal structure. The resulting form is metastable at room pressure while under , but collapses into ice I (ordinary ice) when brought above .

Hydrogen storage 
The discovery announcement also mentioned that ice XVII could repeatedly adsorb and release hydrogen molecules without degrading its structure.  The total amount of hydrogen that ice XVII can adsorb depends on the amount of pressure applied, but hydrogen molecules can be adsorbed by ice XVII even at pressures as low as a few millibars if the temperature is under . The adsorbed hydrogen molecules can then be released, or desorbed, through the application of heat. This was an unexpected property of ice XVII, and could allow it to be used for hydrogen storage, an issue often mentioned in environmental technology.

Aside from storing hydrogen via compression or liquification, it can also be stored within a solid substance, either via a reversible chemical process (chemisorption) or by having the hydrogen molecules attach to the substance via the van der Waals force (physisorption). The storage method used by ice XVII falls in the latter category, physisorption. In physisorption, there is no chemical reaction, and the chemical bond between the two atoms within a hydrogen molecule remains intact. Because of this, the number of adsorption–desorption cycles ice XVII can withstand is "theoretically infinite".

One significant advantage of using ice XVII as a hydrogen storage medium is the low cost of the only two chemicals involved: hydrogen and water. In addition, ice XVII has shown the ability to store hydrogen at an H to HO molar ratio above 40%, higher than the theoretical maximum ratio for sII clathrate hydrates, another potential storage medium.

Cubic ice 
It was reported in 2020 that cubic ice based on heavy water (DO) can be formed from ice XVII. This was done by heating specially prepared DO ice XVII powder. The result was free of structural deformities compared to standard cubic ice, or ice I. This discovery was reported around the same time another research group announced that they were able to obtain pure DO cubic ice by first synthesizing filled ice in the C phase, and then decompressing it.

See also 
 Hydrogen clathrate

Notes

References 

Hydrogen storage
Water ice
2016 in science